Banani Bidyaniketan School and College is a public school and college in Banani, Dhaka, Bangladesh.

History 
Banani Bidyaniketan was established in 1972 with just 197 students in presence of former Education Minister Yousuf Ali, former chairman of DIT who donated 7.5 Bigha land, members of "Banani Nabarun Society", Member of Parliament & MCA Syed Qumrul Islam Saleh Uddin (Faridpur-3). Banani Bidyaniketan started its journey on 31 January 1972 in an abandoned house of Mr. Osman, who was a Pakistani Citizen. Mrs. Asesha Amin (Lily) was the founder and Principal of this school. Later on, the school moved to its permanent campus. Banani Bidyaniketan was awarded "The Best Institute in Dhaka City Corporation" in the year 2001.

Curriculum 
 Secondary Level SSC
 Group — science & business studies
 Higher Secondary Level HSC
 Group — science & business studies

Notable alumni 

 Mamun Al Mahtab (Shwapnil) is a Bangladeshi hepatologist

References 

High schools in Bangladesh
Colleges in Dhaka District
Educational institutions established in 1972
1972 establishments in Bangladesh